Moshenskoy (masculine), Moshenskaya (feminine), or Moshenskoye (neuter) is the name of several rural localities in Russia:
Moshenskoye, Kaliningrad Oblast, a settlement in Novostroyevsky Rural Okrug of Ozyorsky District of Kaliningrad Oblast
Moshenskoye, Novgorod Oblast, a selo in Moshenskoye Settlement of Moshenskoy District of Novgorod Oblast